The Usambara weaver (Ploceus nicolli) is a species of bird in the family Ploceidae.
It is endemic to Tanzania.

Its natural habitats are subtropical or tropical moist montane forests and plantations .
It is threatened by habitat loss.

References

External links
 Usambara weaver -  Species text in Weaver Watch.

Usambara weaver
Endemic birds of Tanzania
Usambara weaver
Usambara weaver
Taxonomy articles created by Polbot